Francesco Panetta (born 10 January 1963 in Siderno) is a former Italian long-distance runner, who won several medals at international championships in the 1980s.

Career
Panetta's greatest achievement was the victory at the 1987 World Championships in the 3000m steeplechase in Rome. 

In the previous year Panetta won a silver medal at the 1986 European Championships in Stuttgart, only narrowly losing to the East German runner Hagen Melzer. 

At the 1988 Olympic Games, Panetta finished ninth in the 3000m steeplechase. 

Panetta won a gold medal in the 3000m steeplechase at the 1990 European Championships in Split.

Throughout his career, Panetta set several Italian records (including 3000m and 10000m). In 1987 he ran the 3000m steeplechase in 8:08.57 min which is the current Italian national record.

See also
 Italian all-time top lists - 3000 metres steeplechase
 Italian all-time top lists - 5000 metres
 Italian all-time top lists - 10000 metres
 FIDAL Hall of Fame

External links
 

1963 births
Living people
People from Siderno
Italian male cross country runners
Italian male long-distance runners
Italian male steeplechase runners
Olympic athletes of Italy
Athletes (track and field) at the 1984 Summer Olympics
Athletes (track and field) at the 1988 Summer Olympics
World Athletics Championships athletes for Italy
World Athletics Championships medalists
European Athletics Championships medalists
World Athletics Championships winners
Sportspeople from the Metropolitan City of Reggio Calabria